Yengejeh-ye Molla Mohammad Hasan (also Romanized as Yengejeh-ye Mollā Moḩammad Ḩasan) is a village in Gharbi Rural District, in the Central District of Ardabil County, Ardabil Province, Iran. At the 2006 census, its population was 822, in 178 families.

References 

Towns and villages in Ardabil County